Shatoy, is a rural locality (a selo) and the administrative center of Shatoysky District of the Chechen Republic, Russia. Population:

Geography
It is located in the southern part of the republic, on the right bank of the Argun River, in the Argun Gorge. Grozny is 57 km away.

The nearest settlements: in the north-west - the villages of Hakkoy, Syuzhi and Great Varanda; in the northeast - the village of Zones; in the southeast, the villages of Bekum-Kale and Pamyat; in the south, the villages of Varda and Gush-Kurt; in the south-west is the village of Vashindara [3].

Climate
Shatoy has a humid continental climate (Köppen climate classification: Dfb).

References

Rural localities in Shatoysky District